Fidelity Bank  is a commercial bank in Ghana which was issued with its Universal Banking License on June 28, 2006, making it the 22nd bank to be licensed by the Bank of Ghana. It is one of the twenty-seven licensed commercial banks in the country.

Fidelity Bank is headquartered in Accra, at Ridge Towers. , the bank operates 73 networked branches and 120 VISA enabled ATMs at various locations.

See also
List of banks in Ghana
Economy of Ghana

References

Banks of Ghana
Banks established in 1990